The Grammy Award for Best Music Film is an accolade presented at the Grammy Awards, a ceremony that was established in 1958 and originally named the Gramophone Awards, to performers, directors, and producers of quality videos or musical programs.

Criteria
Honors in several categories are presented at the ceremony annually by the National Academy of Recording Arts and Sciences of the United States to "honor artistic achievement, technical proficiency and overall excellence in the recording industry, without regard to album sales or chart position". In order to qualify for this category, concert/performance films or music documentaries must be released theatrically or for sale to the public for the first time or first appearing on television or online during the current eligibility year. Dramatic feature films and biopics are not eligible.

Background
The category was preceded by the Grammy Award for Video of the Year, which was presented in 1982 and 1983, awarding long form videos (or video albums as they were known back then) in the budding music video market. Along with the similar honor Grammy Award for Best Short Form Music Video, this award was first presented in 1984. From 1984 to 1985, the accolade was known as Best Video Album, but in 1986, it was renamed to Best Music Video, Long Form. From 1998 to 2012, it was named Best Long Form Music Video, before changing to Best Music Film since 2013.

In 1988 and 1989, the award criteria were changed and the video accolades were presented under the categories Best Concept Music Video and Best Performance Music Video. The awards were returned to the original format in 1990. Except in 1988 and 1989, the Grammy Award for Best Long Form Music Video recipients included the artists, directors, and producers associated with the winning videos. The Best Music Film category is one of two categories in the Best Music Video/Film Field. The other one is Best Music Video, which recognises stand-alone videos of one song or performance.

Multiple wins and nominations
Singers Madonna and Sting hold the record for the most wins as a performer in this category, with two each, while there have been three films about The Beatles among the winners. However, in two instances, The Beatles were not recognized as individual winners. To date, three directors won the award twice: David Mallet, Jonas Akerlund and Bob Smeaton. Beyoncé holds the record for the most nominations with five. The British pop rock group Eurythmics and Coldplay hold the record for the most nominations as a performer without a win, with three each. Although Beyoncé also held four losing nominations, she won with her fourth nomination with Homecoming in 2020.

Recipients
In 1984 and 1985, only the artists were presented with an award. In 1986 the award went to the artist(s) and the video director(s). From 1987 onwards, the award has been presented to the artist(s), video director(s) and video producer(s). (Nominations list performing artists only).

 Each year is linked to the article about the Grammy Awards held that year.
 Director(s) are only indicated if they were presented a Grammy Award.
 Award was not presented. Music video categories presented that year included Best Concept Music Video and Best Performance Music Video.
 Award not presented to the performing artist (only to video director(s) and video producer(s))
Director unknown; award presented to video producers only

Notes
≈ indicates an Academy Award for Best Documentary Feature winner
± indicates an Academy Award for Best Documentary Feature nominee

See also
 List of Grammy Award categories
 List of most expensive music videos
 One shot (music video)

References

External links
Official site of the Grammy Awards

 
Long Form Music Video